This is a list of 406 species in the genus Ceutorhynchus.

Ceutorhynchus species

References

Ceutorhynchus